Singel Uitgeverijen is a major Dutch publishing group, headquartered in Amsterdam. Its subsidiaries are Nijgh & Van Ditmar, De Arbeiderspers, Athenaeum, Polak & Van Gennep, De Geus, and Volt.

Conserve
Conserve, a former publishing house that merged into Singel on 1 January 2019, is now an imprint. Conserve books are published as De Geus-Conserve or Volt-Conserve.

Conserve (Dutch: "Uitgeverij Conserve") was established as a Dutch publishing organization in 1983 in Schoorl by Kees de Bakker. The company specialised in publishing historical novels. Cynthia McLeod was one of the authors published by Conserve. Publications include Lord of Formosa.

Brave New Books
Brave New Books is Singel's platform for self-publication, in collaboration with Bol.com.

References

External links
 Conserve 

Book publishing companies of the Netherlands